Aradului is a district of Timișoara. Its name comes from the homonymous road (Calea Aradului) that connects Timișoara to Arad. Calea Aradului divides the district into two: Aradului Vest and Aradului Est. The King Michael I University of Life Sciences is located in this district.

Transport 
  Bus: E1, E2, E6
  Trolleybus: 17, 18

References 

Districts of Timișoara